Humanize Human is the fifth and final album by French metal band Massacra. It was released in 1995.

Track listing
  "Need for Greed"   – 7:39  
  "Feel Unreal"  – 4:33  
  "My Only Friend"  – 4:06  
  "Mad to be Normal"  – 5:30  
  "How Free are You"  – 5:21  
  "Humanize Human"  – 5:10  
  "Dejected"  – 5:40  
  "Zero Tolerance"  – 4:53  
  "Pay for my Tears"  – 7:17

Personnel
Jean-Marc Tristani - Lead guitar
Fred Duval - Rhythm guitar
Pascal Jorgensen - Vocals, Bass
Björn Crugger - Drums

1995 albums
Massacra albums
Rough Trade Records albums